Chief Eagle Eye Creek (formerly Squaw Creek) is a  long a river in western Idaho, United States, that is a tributary of the Payette River.

Description

Name Change
Due to the offensive nature of the word Squaw, the United States Board on Geographic Names approved changing the creek's name from Squaw Creek to Chief Eagle Eye Creek on September 8, 2022.

See also

 List of rivers of Idaho
 List of longest streams of Idaho

References

Rivers of Gem County, Idaho
Rivers of Valley County, Idaho
Rivers of Idaho